Food writing is a genre of writing that focuses on food and includes works by food critics, food journalists, chefs and food historians.

Definition
Food writers regard food as a substance and a cultural phenomenon. John T. Edge, an American food writer, explains how writers in the genre view its topic: "Food is essential to life. It’s arguably our nation’s biggest industry. Food, not sex, is our most frequently indulged pleasure. Food—too much, not enough, the wrong kind, the wrong frequency—is one of our society’s greatest causes of disease and death."  Another American food writer, Mark Kurlansky, links this vision of food directly to food writing, giving the genre's scope and range when he observes: “Food is about agriculture, about ecology, about man’s relationship with nature, about the climate, about nation-building, cultural struggles, friends and enemies, alliances, wars, religion. It is about memory and tradition and, at times, even about sex.”Because food writing is topic centered, it is not a genre in itself, but a writing that uses a wide range of traditional genres, including recipes, journalism, memoir, and travelogues. Food writing can refer to poetry and fiction, such as Marcel Proust’s À la recherche du temps perdu (In Search of Lost Time), with its famous passage where the narrator recollects his childhood memories as a result of sipping tea and eating a madeleine; or Robert Burns' poem "Address to a Haggis", 1787. Charles Dickens, a notable novelist wrote memorably about food, e.g., in his A Christmas Carol (1843).

Often, food writing is used to specify writing that takes a more literary approach to food, such as that of the famous American food writer M. F. K. Fisher, who describes her writing about food as follows:

It seems to me our three basic needs, for food and security and love, are so mixed and mingled and entwined that we cannot straightly think of one without the others. So it happens that when I write of hunger, I am really writing about love and the hunger for it, and warmth and the love of it and the hunger for it ... and then the warmth and richness and fine reality of hunger satisfied ... and it is all one.

In this literary sense, food writing aspires toward more than merely communicating information about food; it also aims to provide readers with an aesthetic experience. Another American food writer, Adam Gopnik, divides food writing into two categories, "the mock epic and the mystical microcosmic," and provides examples of their most noted practitioners: 

The mock epic (A. J. Liebling, Calvin Trillin, the French writer Robert Courtine, and any good restaurant critic) is essentially comic and treats the small ambitions of the greedy eater as though they were big and noble, spoofing the idea of the heroic while raising the minor subject to at least temporary greatness. The mystical microcosmic, of which Elizabeth David and M. F. K. Fisher are the masters, is essentially poetic, and turns every remembered recipe into a meditation on hunger and the transience of its fulfillment. Contemporary food writers working in this mode include Ruth Reichl, Betty MacDonald, and Jim Harrison.

As a term, "food writing" is a relatively new descriptor.  It came into wide use in the 1990s and, unlike "sports writing", or "nature writing", it has yet to be included in the Oxford English Dictionary. Consequently, definitions of food writing when applied to historical works are retrospective. Classics of food writing, such as the 18th century French gastronome Jean Anthelme Brillat-Savarin's La physiologie du goût (The Physiology of Taste), pre-date the term and have helped to shape its meaning.

In academia
Food writer Michael Pollan holds the Knight Professorship of Science and Environmental Journalism at the University of California, Berkeley and since 2013 has directed the 11th Hour Food and Farming Journalism Fellowship Program.

In 2013, the University of South Florida St. Petersburg began a graduate certificate program in Food Writing and Photography, created by longtime Tampa Bay Times food and travel editor Janet K. Keeler.

Notable food writers and books

Authors
This is a list of some prominent writers on food, cooking, dining, and cultural history related to food.

Karen Anand
Robert Appelbaum
Archestratus
Athenaeus
James Beard
Maggie Beer
Mrs Beeton
Edward Behr
Raymond Blanc
Anthony Bourdain
Jean-Anthelme Brillat-Savarin
Alton Brown
Robert Farrar Capon
Julia Child
Mei Chin
Craig Claiborne
Brendan Connell
Shirley Corriher
Fanny Cradock
Elizabeth Craig
Curnonsky
Tarla Dalal
Elizabeth David
Alan Davidson
Emiko Davies
Giada De Laurentiis
Avis DeVoto
Andrew Dornenburg
Escoffier
Judith Lynn Ferguson
Susie Fishbein
M. F. K. Fisher
Alexandros Giotis
Adam Gopnik
Gael Greene
Jane Grigson
Marcella Hazan
Karen Hess
Amanda Hesser
Kate Heyhoe
Alison Holst
Judith Jones
Diana Kennedy
Christopher Kimball
Mark Kurlansky
Kylie Kwong
Nigella Lawson
David Leite
Paul Levy
A. J. Liebling
Manju Malhi
Ginette Mathiot
Harold McGee
Zora Mintalová - Zubercová
Prosper Montagné
Massimo Montanari
Joan Nathan
Marion Nestle
Jamie Oliver
Richard Olney
Clementine Paddleford
Karen A. Page
Jean Paré
Angelo Pellegrini
Elizabeth Robins Pennell
Jacques Pépin
Michael Pollan
Edouard de Pomiane
Wolfgang Puck
Gordon Ramsay
Rachael Ray
Ruth Reichl
Gary Rhodes
Claudia Roden
Waverley Root
Marcel Rouff
Michael Ruhlman
Nigel Slater
Delia Smith
Raymond Sokolov
Jeffrey Steingarten
Joanne Stepaniak
Martha Stewart
John Thorne
Raquel Torres Cerdán
Mapie de Toulouse-Lautrec
Anne Willan
Martin Yan

Important texts in the genre (not easily attributable to an author)
 Larousse Gastronomique (1938; 1961; 1988; 2001: four editions, the first of which describes French cuisine; the last of the three English editions also includes coverage of cuisines other than French; the original editor was Prosper Montagné)
 The Forme of Cury (compiled by the chief master cooks of King Richard II of England)
Le Viandier (a French cookery book of the 14th century)

See also

 List of chefs
 Cookbook
 Gastronomy
 Gourmet ideal
 Gourmet Museum and Library
 Guild of Food Writers of the United Kingdom

References

Further reading
Golden, Lilly, ed. (1993) A Literary Feast: an anthology. New York: Atlantic Monthly Press;  (authors include V. S. Pritchett, W. Somerset Maugham, Jorge Luis Borges, M. F. K. Fisher, Ernest  Hemingway, Isak Dinesen, Virginia Woolf, and James Joyce)

External links
Books for Cooks An online exhibit of historical cookbooks at the British Library.
"Dining Out: The Food Critic at Table" A review of food writing and writers by Adam Gopnik that examines the genre.
"In Defense of Food Writing: A Reader’s Manifesto" A defense of the genre by Eric LeMay based on Michael Pollan's In Defense of Food.
"On Food Writing"  Advice about the craft of food writing from Michael Ruhlman.
"Between the Lines: Picnic in the Democrative Forest" An argument that food writing should take on "a democratic way of looking at our food culture."
"Interview with Jonathan Gold" Appears in The Believer, September 2012.

Food writing
Food-related literary genres